Sajenice is a small settlement in the Municipality of Mirna in southeastern Slovenia. It lies on the regional road leading northwest out of Mirna towards Gabrovka and Litija. The area is part of the traditional region of Lower Carniola. The municipality is now included in the Southeast Slovenia Statistical Region.

References

External links
Sajenice on Geopedia

Populated places in the Municipality of Mirna